The 1962 Giro di Lombardia was the 56th edition of the Giro di Lombardia cycle race and was held on 20 October 1962. The race started in Milan and finished in Como. The race was won by Jo de Roo of the Saint-Raphaël team.

General classification

References

1962
Giro di Lombardia
Giro di Lombardia
1962 Super Prestige Pernod